Riptide is a fictional superhero from Image Comics created by Rob Liefeld. She first appeared in Youngblood #1 (April 1992).

Fictional character biography
Riptide got her powers during an undersea accident that would have killed her if not for the mysterious Sea Witch. Her father, Storybook Smith, had carefully written a story on the origins of her powers many years earlier. Her father left before she was born, but she must have grown up with the story of her famous father and his book, which had been stolen.

When Leanna got her powers, she joined Youngblood. Originally she did it to make some quick money but soon became an integral part of the team.

When Riptide agreed to pose nude in Pussicat magazine, she was apparently fired from Youngblood, but after Crypt had destroyed part of Youngblood and Battlestone became the leader, she was asked to join again.

During a Youngblood barbecue at the Marcus Langston/Sentinel household, Riptide found her father's missing book on Langston's shelves and took it. When Langston realized who had taken the book, he went to Riptide's room to take it back while she was out walking. Unfortunately, Leanna came back early and surprised him. In the following fight, Langston killed her in cold blood and tried to frame Knightsabre for the murder. Langston's plans were revealed by Toby King, who found the book, and Langston was put in the Hell of Mirrors in Supreme's Citadel.

Image Comics female superheroes
Arcade Comics characters
Characters created by Rob Liefeld
Fictional characters with water abilities
Comics characters introduced in 1992